The men's 100 metre backstroke was a swimming event held as part of the swimming at the 1932 Summer Olympics programme. It was the sixth appearance of the event, which was established in 1908. The competition was held from Wednesday August 10, 1932 to Friday August 12, 1932.

Sixteen swimmers from nine nations competed.

Medalists

Records
These were the standing world and Olympic records (in minutes) prior to the 1932 Summer Olympics.

Results

Heats

Wednesday August 10, 1932: The fastest two in each heat and the fastest third-placed from across the heats advanced to the final.

Heat 1

Heat 2

Heat 3

Heat 4

Semifinals

Thursday August 11, 1932: The fastest three in each semi-final advanced to the final.

Semifinal 1

Semifinal 2

Final

Friday August 12, 1932: Ernst Küppers who seems to be the main rival of the Japanese swimmers committed a false start, maybe this was the reason why he was only able to finish fifth.

References

External links
Olympic Report
 

Swimming at the 1932 Summer Olympics
Men's events at the 1932 Summer Olympics